(2,4,6-Trimethylphenyl)gold is a member of a special group of compounds where an aryl carbon atom acts as a bridge between two gold atoms. This compound is formed in a reaction between Au(CO)Cl and the Grignard reagent mesitylmagnesium bromide. It crystallizes as a cyclical pentamer.

References 

Gold(I) compounds
Organogold compounds
Aromatic compounds